Lorenzo Esposito (born 2 December 1983) known professionally as Lehar is an Italian DJ and producer and is signed by techno label Diynamic. With performances at Tomorrowland he belongs to the most prominent DJs of Venice.

Musical career 
Lehar was born in Naples, grew up near Venice and graduated from university at IULM. After attending parties with music by the likes of François Kevorkian and Tony Humphries he grew interest in electronic music. His first record was released at Connaisseur Recordings in 2013. Under this label Lehar published a remix of "Spirit Lights" by Of Norway and a collaboration with Musumeci named "Horizon". In 2016 he signed to Solomun's label Diynamic with the first release being a remix for Ost & Kjex called "Easy". These three tracks reached the number one spot at the Beatport electronic chart. In the same year he played his first tour called "All Through The Night" across several cities in Europe. On Diynamic Lehar released an album and has contributed to their "10 Years of Diynamic" album. In 2018, he played his second tour. He also had appearances at Tomorrowland in 2017, 2018 and 2019. In 2019, he was playing a residency show called "MUSE" in Ibiza.

Discography

Releases 
 2015: Flora & Zephyr EP – Connaisseur Recordings
2015: Sargas EP – Connaisseur Recordings
2016: Lonestar Memories (10 Years Diynamic Compilation) – Diynamic Music
2016: Magical Realism EP – Diynamic Music
2016: Number One Hero EP – 2DIY4
2016: The White Diary EP – Connaisseur Recordings
2017: Lehar, Olderic – Il Sole – Siamese
2017: Picture: Lehar – Diynamic
2017: Lehar & Musumeci – Lotus Ep – Endless
2018: Penta EP – Multinotes
2018: Blue Wolf – Watergate Records
2019: Everything I Ever Did – Compost Black Label
2019: Da Levante feat. Aldebaran – Afterlife
2019: Signature EP – Multinotes

Remixes 
 2014: Kollektiv Turmstrasse – Tristesse (Lehar Remix) – Connaisseur Recordings
2015: Mario Aureo & Spieltape – Keep Pushin’ (Lehar Dub) – Moodmusic
2015: Mario Aureo & Spieltape – Keep Pushin’ (Lehar Remix) – Moodmusic
2015: Musumeci & The Element – Demiurgo (Lehar Remix) – Connaisseur
2015: Ost & Kjex – Easy (Lehar & Musumeci Remix) – Diynamic Music
2015: Of Norway – Spirit Lights (Lehar Remix) – Connaisseur Recordings
2016: Francesco Chiocci – Black Sunrise (Lehar Remix) – Connaisseur
2016: Sasse – Ani (Lehar Remix) – My favorite Robot
2017: Guy J, Khen – Prism (Lehar in Ipnosi Remix) – Lost & Found
2019: Colle, Oluhle – Owami (Lehar Remix) – TrueColors

References 

1983 births
Living people
Italian DJs